Thermopolis is the county seat and largest town in Hot Springs County, Wyoming, United States. As of the 2020 U.S. Census, the town population was 2,725.

Thermopolis is Greek for "hot city."  It is home to numerous natural hot springs, in which mineral-laden waters are heated by geothermal processes. The town is named for the hot springs located there.

The town claims the world's largest mineral hot spring, appropriately named "The Big Spring", as part of Hot Springs State Park. The springs are open to the public for free as part of an 1896 treaty signed with the Shoshone and Arapaho Indian tribes.

Dinosaur fossils were found on the Warm Springs Ranch in 1993, and the Wyoming Dinosaur Center was founded soon after.

Geography
Thermopolis is located near the northern end of the Wind River Canyon and Wedding of the Waters, where the north-flowing Wind River becomes the Bighorn River. It is an unusual instance of a river changing names at a point other than a confluence of two streams. The dual name is ascribed to the mountain barrier between the Wind River and Bighorn basins, obscuring the fact that the river that drains the two is the same. The term "Wedding of the Waters" dates to at least 1934, when a marker was placed at the location.

Thermopolis is ringed by mountains, with the Big Horn Mountains to the northeast, the Bridger Mountains to the southeast, the Owl Creek Mountains to the southwest and the Absaroka Range to the northwest. Thermopolis is the southernmost municipality in the Big Horn Basin.

Roundtop Mountain, on the northern edge of town, is a unique geological formation shaped much like a volcano.

Climate
According to the Köppen Climate Classification system, Thermopolis has a cool semi-arid climate, abbreviated BSk on climate maps.

Demographics

2010 census
As of the census of 2010, there were 3,009 people, 1,389 households, and 818 families residing in the town. The racial makeup of the town was 96.4% White, 0.3% African American, 0.9% Native American, 0.5% Asian, 0.4% from other races, and 1.5% from two or more races. Hispanic or Latino of any race were 2.2% of the population.

There were 1,389 households, of which 24.0% had children under the age of 18 living with them, 44.3% were married couples living together, 10.4% had a female householder with no husband present, 4.1% had a male householder with no wife present, and 41.1% were non-families. 35.8% of all households were made up of individuals, and 14.8% had someone living alone who was 65 years of age or older. The average household size was 2.11 and the average family size was 2.70.

The median age in the town was 47 years. 20.1% of residents were under the age of 18; 7.2% were between the ages of 18 and 24; 20.2% were from 25 to 44; 30.5% were from 45 to 64; and 22.1% were 65 years of age or older. The gender makeup of the town was 49.1% male and 50.9% female.

2000 census
As of the census of 2000, there were 3,172 people, 1,342 households, and 849 families residing in the town. The population density was 1,331.0 people per square mile (514.6/km2). There were 1,568 housing units at an average density of 657.9 per square mile (254.4/km2). The racial makeup of the town was 95.90% White, 0.47% African American, 1.70% Native American, 0.25% Asian, 0.50% from other races, and 1.17% from two or more races. Hispanic or Latino of any race were 2.30% of the population.

There were 1,342 households, out of which 26.8% had children under the age of 18 living with them, 52.0% were married couples living together, 8.9% had a female householder with no husband present, and 36.7% were non-families. 32.1% of all households were made up of individuals, and 13.9% had someone living alone who was 65 years of age or older. The average household size was 2.26 and the average family size was 2.86.

In the town, the population was spread out, with 22.5% under the age of 18, 6.4% from 18 to 24, 23.2% from 25 to 44, 26.9% from 45 to 64, and 21.0% who were 65 years of age or older. The median age was 44 years. Gender makeup for this period was 47.2% male and 52.8% female.

The median income for a household in the town was $29,205, and the median income for a family was $38,448. Males had a median income of $26,824 versus $18,438 for females. The per capita income for the town was $16,648. About 8.3% of families and 10.1% of the population were below the poverty line, including 11.3% of those under age 18 and 6.5% of those age 65 or over.

Economy

Tourism
Because of Hot Springs State Park, tourism is of considerable economic importance to Thermopolis. A state maintained herd of American Bison reside in Hot Springs State Park, which extends into the northeast corner of town. Two hot mineral water concessions with numerous water slides and other attractions, the Teepee Pools and Star Plunge are located within the park. Two hotels, Days Inn-Safari Club and Best Western-Plaza Inn, are also in the park. Other tourism-related businesses in and near the town include the Downtown Thermopolis Historic District, the Hot Springs County Museum and Cultural Center and the Wind River Canyon Whitewater Rafting. Thermopolis (indeed, all of Hot Springs County) levies a 4% lodging tax for boarders in county hotels and motels.

The Hot Springs County Museum and Cultural Center has an eclectic collection of memorabilia from local pioneers circa 1890 through 1910, with plans to focus on Tim McCoy, who lived in Hot Springs County from 1912 to 1942, during which he built the High Eagle Ranch about 45 miles west of town. He worked for many years as an actor in what are now called B westerns, or lower-budget cowboy movies in Hollywood.

Nearby East Thermopolis is home to the Wyoming Dinosaur Center, a non-profit corporation that conducts paleontology digs in the area and maintains a visitor center with a museum, gift shop and snack bar.  They offer daily tours of the dig site that allow visitors to participate in excavations.

Every May since 1993, thousands of basketball players have descended upon Thermopolis for the annual 3 on 3 Hot Spot Shootout Basketball Tournament. The tournament shuts down several blocks of the city for the weekend, as up to 60+ temporary basketball courts are constructed on city streets in the downtown area. The event is co-sponsored by the Hot Springs County Chamber of Commerce and Hoop World Basketball.

On August 21, 2017, Thermopolis experienced a total eclipse of the sun.

Education
Public education in the town of Thermopolis is provided by Hot Springs County School District #1 It is the only school district in the county. HSCSD1 includes Ralph Witters Elementary School, Thermopolis Middle School, Hot Springs County High School, and a building for the county auditorium and district administrative offices, all in Thermopolis. Lucerne Intermediate School, a facility for fourth and fifth graders located in Lucerne, closed in 2005. Fourth and fifth graders now attend the recently expanded Ralph Witters Elementary.  All of HSCSD1's athletic teams are known as the Thermopolis Bobcats, and their colors are purple and gold.  Hot Springs County High School's athletics are currently classified to compete as the smallest school (by enrollment) in class 3A (some programs are currently in Class 2A, such as varsity football) by the Wyoming High School Activities Association.  The estimated high school enrollment for the 2017–18 school year is 209 students.  By comparison, the largest 3A school, Riverton High School's estimated 2017-18 enrollment, stands at 787 students.

Media
The Thermopolis Independent Record, a weekly newspaper, has been published since 1901 and has a circulation of 1,800. Classic country station KDNO and Wyoming Public Media classical music affiliate KUWT both broadcast from Thermopolis.

Infrastructure

Postal service
The United States Postal Service operates the Thermopolis Post Office under ZIP code 82443.

Health care
The Wyoming Department of Health's Wyoming Pioneer Home, an assisted living facility for the elderly owned and run by the State of Wyoming, is located in Thermopolis. The facility was operated by the Wyoming Board of Charities and Reform until that agency was dissolved as a result of a state constitutional amendment passed in November 1990. The facility sits in the heart of the scenic Hot Springs State Park.

Hot Springs County Memorial Hospital is a full-service hospital located in Thermopolis. It is a 25-bed Critical Access Hospital that provides state of the art equipment.

Gottsche Rehab Center is located within the campus of Hot Springs County Memorial Hospital. It serves as a rehabilitation center for those in need after serious treatment at Hot Springs County Memorial Hospital. The building went under huge renovation in 2018.

Red Rock Family Practice is a small health facility in East Thermopolis. The building is usually served as a minor treatment clinic, and is a branch of Hot Springs County Memorial Hospital.

Transportation

Highways
 U.S. Route 20 - 
 - 
 -

Airport

Thermopolis is served by the Hot Springs County–Thermopolis Municipal Airport near Grass Creek, Wyoming for basic aviation.

Notable people

 Wyatt Agar, a Republican member of the Wyoming Senate (2017–2021) and rancher
 Don Bracken (1962–2014), American football punter at the University of Michigan and in the NFL for the Green Bay Packers and Los Angeles Rams
 Clayton Danks (1879–1970), Three-time Cheyenne Frontier Days winner, model of the Wyoming cowboy symbol; died in Thermopolis in 1970
 Mike Enzi (1944–2021), United States Senator from Wyoming (1997–2021)
 Dave Freudenthal (born 1950), governor of Wyoming (2003–2011)
 Steve Freudenthal (born 1949), a Democratic politician who served as the 28th Attorney General of Wyoming from 1981 until 1983
 W. Michael Gear, a writer and archaeologist
 Kathleen O'Neal Gear, a writer and archaeologist
 Morris H. Hansen, a statistician who was born in Thermopolis
 Dora McGrath, the first woman elected to the Wyoming State Senate
 Barton R. Voigt, former Chief Justice of the Wyoming Supreme Court
John Winter, Republican member of the Wyoming House of Representatives (2019–present) and rancher
 Nathan Winters, former Republican member of the Wyoming House of Representatives (2013–2019)

References

External links

Town website
Thermopolis Independent Record, weekly newspaper
Thermopolis-Hot Springs Chamber of Commerce

Towns in Hot Springs County, Wyoming
Towns in Wyoming
County seats in Wyoming
Hot springs of Wyoming
Spa towns in the United States
Landforms of Hot Springs County, Wyoming